Rutgersella truexi is a form species for problematic fossils of Early Silurian age in Pennsylvania. It has been of special interest because of its morphological similarity with the iconic Ediacaran fossil Dickinsonia, and may have been a late surviving vendobiont.

Description 

Rutgersella truexi is a flat, segmented fossil, with both radial and bilateral symmetry like Dickinsonia, but with a shorter midline. The fossils are pyritized; some internal chambers are filled with chalcedony, so that they are preserved along with proposed "basal rhizines". Controversially, according to Retallack, these observations suggest affinities with lichens, and perhaps the fungal phylum Glomeromycota, a statement not currently supported by more verifiable palaeontologists.

References 

Silurian fungi
Controversial taxa
Enigmatic prehistoric animal genera
Fossil taxa described in 1968